Irakli ("Heracles") is a beach situated in the middle part of the Bulgarian Black Sea Coast south of Obzor.

Honour
Irakli Peak on Graham Land in Antarctica is named after Irakli.

See also
 Natura 2000

External links

https://web.archive.org/web/20070622110650/http://www.bnr.bg/RadioBulgaria/Emission_English/Theme_Science_And_Nature/Material/Irakli.htm
Facts about the destruction of Irakli (in Bulgarian)
List of the illegal builders and buildings in Bulgarian protected areas

Beaches of Bulgaria
Landforms of Burgas Province